Pseudischyrus is a genus of pleasing fungus beetles in the family Erotylidae. There are at least four described species in Pseudischyrus.

Species
These four species belong to the genus Pseudischyrus:
 Pseudischyrus acuminatus Casey
 Pseudischyrus extricatus (Crotch, 1873)
 Pseudischyrus nigrans (Crotch, 1873)
 Pseudischyrus ventriloquax Boyle, 1956

References

Further reading

 
 

Erotylidae
Articles created by Qbugbot